Stathmopoda distincta is a moth of the family Stathmopodidae. It was described by Alfred Philpott in 1923. It is endemic to New Zealand.

References

Moths described in 1923
Stathmopodidae
Taxa named by Alfred Philpott
Moths of New Zealand
Endemic fauna of New Zealand
Endemic moths of New Zealand